Events from the year 1746 in Russia

Incumbents
 Monarch – Elizabeth

Events

Births

 Sophia Razumovskaya, courtier  (b. 1803)

Deaths

References

1746 in the Russian Empire
Years of the 18th century in the Russian Empire